Happy-Go-Lucky is a 2008 British comedy-drama film written and directed by Mike Leigh. The screenplay focuses on a cheerful and optimistic primary school teacher and her relationships with those around her. The film was well received by critics and resulted in a number of awards for Mike Leigh's direction and screenplay, lead actress Sally Hawkins's performance, and Eddie Marsan's performance in a supporting role.

Plot
Thirty years old and single, Pauline "Poppy" Cross shares a London flat with her best friend Zoe, a fellow teacher. Poppy is free-minded, high-spirited and kind-hearted. The film opens with Poppy trying to engage a shop employee in conversation. He ignores her, yet his icy demeanour does not bother her. She maintains her good mood even when she discovers her bicycle has been stolen. Her main concern is not getting a new one or finding the bicycle, but that she did not get a chance to say goodbye to it. This prompts her to decide to learn how to drive.

When Poppy takes driving lessons for the first time, her positive attitude contrasts starkly with her gloomy, intolerant and cynical driving instructor, Scott. He is emotionally repressed, has anger problems and becomes extremely agitated by Poppy's casual attitude towards driving. As Poppy gets to know him, it becomes evident that Scott believes in conspiracy theories. His beliefs are partly attributable to his racist and misogynistic views, which make it hard for him to get along with others. Scott seems to be angered by Poppy's sunny personality and what he perceives as a lack of responsibility and concern for driving safety. Scott is exceptionally irritated by Poppy's choice of footwear (a pair of high-heeled boots), which he feels compromises her ability to drive. From the outset, he feels Poppy does not take her lessons seriously and is careless.

Poppy, however, does have the capacity to be responsible. At school, Poppy observes one of her pupils bullying one of his classmates. Rather than becoming angry, she worries about him and takes the appropriate action. After speaking with her pupil, she comes to the correct conclusion that he is being abused at home. A social worker, Tim, is brought in to handle the boy's case. Through Tim and the pupil's interactions, the latter reveals that his mother's boyfriend has been beating him. Tim and Poppy begin dating.

Poppy, Zoe, and Poppy's younger sister, Suzy, go to visit another sister, Helen, who lives with her husband in Southend-on-Sea and is pregnant. Helen proves to be a very judgmental person and tells Poppy she needs to "take life seriously", "not get drunk every night" and plan for the future. Poppy responds that she is happy with her life as it is. Helen tries to convince Poppy to be more responsible condescendingly telling her she is too childish, but Poppy insists that she is happy and ignores her advice.

Returning home, Poppy sees Scott standing across the street from her flat, and when she calls his name, he runs away. When she confronts him he insists he had been visiting his mother in Stevenage at the time she saw him. Scott later sees Poppy with her new boyfriend, Tim, and he becomes angry. During Poppy's subsequent driving lesson, Scott drives erratically while ranting about other drivers and society. When he gives Poppy the keys to his car, she tells him he is in no condition to give a driving lesson, and she will drive him home. Scott tries to get his keys back and physically attacks Poppy. She manages to escape his grasp, then in a long, rambling diatribe Scott accuses Poppy of trying to seduce him, revealing his romantic feelings for her. Using patience and understanding to teach him a lesson, Poppy waits until he has calmed down then gives the keys back, telling him this lesson will be their last.

The film ends with Poppy and Zoe together manoeuvering a rowing boat in Regent's Park, as Zoe advises Poppy she "can't make everyone happy." Poppy cheerfully dismisses the advice, then takes a mobile call from Tim and asks him, "Missing me already?"

Cast
 Sally Hawkins as Pauline "Poppy" Cross
 Eddie Marsan as Scott
 Alexis Zegerman as Zoe
 Andrea Riseborough as Dawn
 Sinead Matthews as Alice
 Sylvestra Le Touzel as Heather
 Kate O'Flynn as Suzy
 Joseph Kloska as Suzy's boyfriend
 Samuel Roukin as Tim
 Caroline Martin as Helen
 Oliver Maltman as Jamie
 Nonso Anozie as Ezra
 Karina Fernandez as Flamenco teacher

Production
The film is Mike Leigh's first film shot in the 2.35 aspect ratio anamorphic format. It was made and distributed with the assistance of National Lottery funding through the UK Film Council, with £1.2 million awarded to the production company, and a further £210,000 awarded to the film's UK distributor.

The film was shot on location in Camden Lock, Camden Market, Regent's Park, Stroud Green, Finsbury Park, Lambeth, and Tufnell Park in London and Southend-on-Sea in Essex.

In Behind the Wheel of Happy-Go-Lucky, a bonus feature on the DVD release of the film, director Leigh, cinematographer Dick Pope, and stars Sally Hawkins and Eddie Marsan discuss the logistics of filming the lengthy scenes in which Poppy is learning how to drive. Five miniature cameras were hidden throughout the vehicle, and at times Leigh was wedged on the floor behind the front seats. Although the actors were required to adhere to basic plot premises, a large percentage of their dialogue was improvised, forcing them to react to stimuli outside the car and interact in character while concentrating on their driving.

In Happy-in-Character, another DVD bonus feature, Leigh and the actors discuss how the director works with his cast one-on-one to help them fully create their characters before actual filming begins. Because Scott is such a troubled individual, Eddie Marsan thought he was preparing for a heavy drama, and it was not until he started working with Sally Hawkins that he realised how funny the film actually was.

The film premiered at the Berlin International Film Festival and was shown at the Dublin Film Festival before going into theatrical release in the UK on 18 April 2008. It later was featured at the Telluride Film Festival, the Toronto International Film Festival, the Rio de Janeiro International Film Festival, the New York Film Festival, the Athens Film Festival, the Mill Valley Film Festival, the Morelia Film Festival, the Chicago International Film Festival, the Warsaw International FilmFest, and the Tokyo International Film Festival.

Reception

Critical response
On Rotten Tomatoes the film has an approval rating of 92% based on 159 reviews, with an average rating of 7.73/10. The critical consensus states that "Mike Leigh's latest partially-improvised film is a light-hearted comedy with moments that bite, and features a brilliant star turn by Sally Hawkins." On Metacritic, the film has a weighted average score of 84, based on 34 reviews, indicating "universal acclaim."

Peter Bradshaw of The Guardian rated the film four out of five stars and said, "Mike Leigh's trademarked cartoony dialogue, as ever lending a neo-Dickensian compression and intensity to the proceedings, is an acquired taste and I have gladly acquired it, though some haven't. I am not quite sure what I think about the big, final confrontation between Poppy and Scott. It is well-acted and composed, and Marsan is ferociously convincing, yet the episode is closed off a little too neatly, and Poppy seems eerily unaffected by this or anything else. The effect is a kind of odd and steely invulnerability: not unattractive exactly, but disconcerting. Hawkins plays it superbly though: exactly right for the part and utterly at ease with a role that is uniquely demanding. In the factory-farmed blandness of the movies, Happy-Go-Lucky has a strong, real taste."

Philip French of The Observer called the film "as funny, serious, life-affirming and beautifully performed as anything Leigh has done, but with a lightness of touch only previously found in his Gilbert and Sullivan movie, Topsy-Turvy."

Manohla Dargis of the New York Times called the film "so closely tuned to the pulse of communal life, to the rhythms of how people work, play and struggle together, it captures the larger picture along with the smaller. Like Poppy, the bright focus of this expansive, moving film, Mr. Leigh isn’t one to go it alone. Played by a glorious Sally Hawkins – a gurgling, burbling stream of gasps, giggles and words – Poppy . . . keeps moving forward and dancing and jumping and laughing and nodding her dark, delicate head as if she were agreeing not just with this or that friend but also with life itself. She's altogether charming or perhaps maddening – much depends on whether you wear rose-colored specs – recognizably human and every inch a calculated work of art."

Roger Ebert of the Chicago Sun-Times rated the film four stars and called Sally Hawkins "a joy to behold." He added, "This is Mike Leigh's funniest film since Life Is Sweet. Of course he hasn't ever made a completely funny film, and Happy-Go-Lucky has scenes that are not funny, not at all. There are always undercurrents and oddness."

Peter Travers of Rolling Stone rated the film 3 out of four stars and commented, "Get ready for Sally Hawkins, a dynamo of an actress who will have her way with you in Happy-Go-Lucky, leaving you enchanted, enraged to the point of madness and utterly dazzled. No list of the year's best performances should be made without her." He added, "In lesser hands, the film would go off the deep end into cheap theatrics. But Leigh . . . keeps the emotions in balance by keeping them real. There's something raw in Hawkins that wins our empathy for Poppy. Thanks to her, Happy-Go-Lucky is more than a movie, it's a gift."

Ruthe Stein of the San Francisco Chronicle stated, "The key to enjoying the film, a minor effort by Leigh, is warming up to Poppy. Her bubbly personality may be too much for some. She's like a walking, talking smiley face. Fortunately, as Leigh proved in Secrets & Lies and Vera Drake, he has a keen eye for actresses, and he has found in Sally Hawkins the consummate Poppy."

Time Out London observed "You know you’re watching something both delightfully light-footed and acutely meaningful when Leigh moves so nimbly between scenes at Poppy's school, her flamenco class and her driving lessons . . . It's a funny film . . . and, crucially, it aches with truth."

Legacy 
The name "En-ra-ha," a driver safety teaching tool used repeatedly by Marsan's character, Scott, as a reminder for the driver to look in the car's mirrors, has become a catch phrase associated both with the film and with Marsan as an actor. During a lesson, Scott explains to Poppy that "En-ra-ha" is a fallen angel and refers to "the all-seeing eye" at the top of a "golden triangle" formed by a car's rearview mirror and side mirrors.  Scott tells Poppy, "You see. You remember. You will remember Enraha till the day you die and I would have done my job."  The name "En-ra-ha" was invented by Marsan during his improvisational preparation for the film, inspired by a recording of the English occultist Aleister Crowley.

Top ten lists
The film was cited as one of the ten best films of 2008 by many critics, including Manohla Dargis, Stephen Holden, and A.O. Scott of the New York Times, Liam Lacey of The Globe and Mail, Ray Bennett of The Hollywood Reporter, Shawn Levy of The Oregonian, Carrie Rickey of The Philadelphia Inquirer, David Edelstein of New York, Elizabeth Weitzman of the New York Daily News, Kimberly Jones of The Austin Chronicle, Michael Sragow of The Baltimore Sun, Kenneth Turan of the Los Angeles Times, Ann Hornaday of The Washington Post, Lisa Schwarzbaum of Entertainment Weekly, Dennis Harvey of Variety, and Steve Rea of The Philadelphia Inquirer. Also, Armond White of the New York Press named Happy Go Lucky the best film of 2008.

Accolades

Home media
The Region 1 DVD was released on 10 March 2009. It is in anamorphic widescreen format with an audio track in English and subtitles in English and Spanish. Bonus features include commentary by screenwriter/director Mike Leigh, Behind the Wheel of Happy-Go-Lucky, and Happy-in-Character.

References

External links
 
 
 
 

2008 films
2008 comedy-drama films
2008 independent films
British comedy-drama films
Films set in London
Films directed by Mike Leigh
Films about educators
2000s English-language films
2000s British films
Films featuring a Best Musical or Comedy Actress Golden Globe winning performance